Douglas Aaron Lumsden (born 31 August 1971) is a Scottish Conservative Party politician. He has been a Member of the Scottish Parliament (MSP) for the North East Scotland region since the election in May 2021. He was previously the co-leader of Aberdeen City Council.

Early life and education 
Douglas was born in Aberdeen in 1971 to parents Douglas and June Lumsden. The younger Douglas was educated at Aberdeen Grammar School and Robert Gordon University, where he studied Electronic and Electrical Engineering.

Career 
Lumsden worked in the IT industry from 1993 to 2017. It was in 2017 that he was first elected to Aberdeen City Council, as one of three councillors representing the Airyhall/Broomhill/Garthdee ward. He was co-leader of the council from 2017 until 2021. Lumsden contested the Aberdeen South seat at the 2019 United Kingdom general election and came second.

In December 2020, Lumsden planned to ask the UK government to fund Aberdeen Council directly, bypassing the Scottish government. He was criticised by the Scottish National Party and Liberal Democrats for disrespecting Scottish devolution; however, the Liberal Democrats also criticised the Scottish government for giving Aberdeen "a horrible and unfair deal on funding". Lumsden claimed that his concern was that "lobbying the Scottish Government and COSLA [Convention of Scottish Local Authorities] for a fairer funding settlement" has not been taken seriously.

At the 2021 Scottish Parliament election, Lumsden was elected to represent North East Scotland.

On 12 January 2022, Lumsden called for Boris Johnson to resign as party leader and Prime Minister over the Westminster lockdown parties controversy, along with a majority of Scottish Conservative MSPs.

Lumsden remained a councillor after his election to Holyrood in order to avoid the expense of a by-election. He did not stand at the 2022 Aberdeen City Council election.

Personal life

References

External links 
 

Living people
Conservative MSPs
Members of the Scottish Parliament 2021–2026
Scottish Conservative Party councillors
Councillors in Aberdeen
1971 births
Scottish Conservative Party parliamentary candidates